Herman Nicolaas Ridderbos (13 February 1909 – 8 March 2007) was a Dutch theologian and biblical scholar. He was an important New Testament theologian, having worked extensively on the history of salvation (Heilsgeschichte) and biblical theology.

Ridderbos was born in Hennaarderadeel, Friesland, Netherlands. His father, Jan Ridderbos, was an ordained minister in the Reformed Churches in the Netherlands, a biblical commentator, and professor of Old Testament at the Theological School of the Reformed Churches of the Netherlands in Kampen. Herman Ridderbos completed his undergraduate studies there, and did his post-graduate work at the Free University of Amsterdam under F. W. Grosheide, qualifying for his doctorate in 1936. In 1943, after serving as a pastor for eight years, Ridderbos was appointed to the post of Professor of New Testament Studies at Kampen, succeeding Seakle Greijdanus who had been one of his professors. He served there for over forty years.

Works 
These are his major writings in chronological order:
 De strekking der Bergrede naar Mattheüs. [The Tenor of the Sermon on the Mount according to Matthew] Kampen: J. H. Kok, 1936. [This was his PhD dissertation.]
 Het Evangelie naar Mattheüs I. [The Gospel to Matthew I] Korte Verklaring der Heilige Schrift. Kampen: J. H. Kok, 1941.
 Het Evangelie naar Mattheüs II. [The Gospel to Matthew II] Korte Verklaring der Heilige Schrift. Kampen: J.H. Kok, 1946.
 Zelfopenbaring en zelfverberging. Het historisch karakter van Jezus’ messiaansche zelfopenbaring volgens de synoptische evangeliën. [Self-revelation and Self-concealment: The Historical Character of Jesus’ Messianic Self-revelation according to the Synoptic Gospels] Kampen: J. H. Kok, 1946.
 De komst van het Koninkrijk. Jezus’ prediking volgens de synoptische evangeliën. Kampen: J. H. Kok, 1950.
 The Coming of the Kingdom, edited by Raymond O. Zorn, translated by H. de Jongste. Philadelphia: Presbyterian and Reformed, 1962 [1969]. 556 pp.
 Paulus en Jezus. Oorsprong en algemeen karakter van Paulus’ Christus-prediking. Kampen: J. H. Kok, 1952.
 Paul and Jesus: Origin and General Character of Paul’s Preaching of Christ, translated by David H. Freeman. Philadelphia: Presbyterian and Reformed, 1958. 155 pp.
 The Epistle of Paul to the Churches of Galatia, translated by Henry Zylstra. The New International Commentary on the New Testament. Grand Rapids: Eerdmans, 1953 [1968, 1970, 1976, 1981]. 238 pp.
 “Israël in het Nieuwe Testament, in het bijzonder volgens Rom. 9 – 11” [“Israel in the New Testament, especially according to Rom. 9 – 11”] in G. Ch. Aalders and H. Ridderbos, Israël, 23 – 73. Exegetica. Oud- en nieuw-testamentische studiën II, 2; Den Haag: Van Keulen, 1955.
 Heilsgeschiedenis en Heilige Schrift van het Nieuwe Testament. Het gezag van het Nieuwe Testament. Kampen: J. H. Kok, 1955.
 The Authority of the New Testament Scriptures, translated by H. de Jongste. Philadelphia: Presbyterian and Reformed, 1963. 93 pp.
 Redemptive History and the New Testament Scriptures, translated by H. De Jongste, revised by Richard B. Gaffin, Jr. Phillipsburg, NJ: Presbyterian and Reformed, 1968; 2nd Rev. ed., 1988. 91 pp.
 When the Time Had Fully Come: Studies in New Testament Theology. Grand Rapids: Eerdmans, 1957. 104 pp.
 Het verborgen Koninkrijk. Handleiding tot het Evangelie van Mattheüs. Kampen: J. H. Kok, 1958.
 Matthew’s Witness to Jesus Christ: The King and the Kingdom. World Christian Books 23. London: Lutterworth Press, 1958.
 Aan de Romeinen. Commentaar op het Nieuwe Testament. [To the Romans] Kampen: J. H. Kok, 1959.
 Bultmann, translated by David H. Freeman. Philadelphia: Presbyterian & Reformed, 1960. 46 pp.
 Aan de Efeziërs. Aan de Colossenzen. Commentaar op het Nieuwe Testament. [To the Ephesians. To the Colossians.] Kampen: J. H. Kok, 1960. *Authored by F. W. Grosheide.
 The Speeches of Peter in the Acts of the Apostles. London: Tyndale Press, 1962 [1977]. 31 pp.
 “Opbouw en strekking van de proloog van het evangelie van Johannes.” [“The Structure and Scope of the Prologue to the Gospel of John”] in Placita Pleiadia. Opstellen aangeboden aan Prof. Dr. G. Sevenster. Leiden: E. J. Brill, 1966. Also published in Novum Testamentum 8 (1966): 180 – 201.
 Paulus. Ontwerp van zijn theologie. Kampen: J. H. Kok, 1966. 653 pp.
 Paul: An Outline of His Theology, translated by John Richard De Witt. Grand Rapids: Eerdmans, 1975 [1997]. 587 pp.
 De Pastorale brieven. Commentaar op het Nieuwe Testament. [The Pastoral Epistles] Kampen: J. H. Kok, 1967.
 Het Woord, het Rijk en onze verlegenheid. [The World, the Kingdom, and Our Embarrassment] Kampen: J. H. Kok, 1968. [During the celebration of the 25th anniversary of his professorship in 1968, his colleagues presented him with a collection of a number of his articles and lectures.]
 “Tradition and Editorship in the Synoptic Gospels,” translated by E. R. Geehan.
 In Jerusalem and Athens: Critical Discussions on the Theology and Apologetics of Cornelius Van Til, edited by E. R. Geehan, 244 – 59. Nutley, NJ: Presbyterian & Reformed, 1971. 498 pp.
 Die Psalmen. Ps 1-41, Ed. Walter De Gruyter, 1972.
 Zijn wij op de verkeerde weg? Een bijbelse studie over de verzoening. [Are We on the Wrong Way? A Biblical Study of Reconciliation] Kampen: J. H. Kok, 1972. [Ridderbos was involved in a controversy about Herman Wiersinga’s dissertation De verzoening in de theologische diskussie [Reconciliation in the Theological Discussion] (Kampen: J. H. Kok, 1971). He wrote this as a response.]
 Studies in Scripture and Its Authority. Grand Rapids: Eerdmans, 1978. 109 pp.
 Het Woord is vlees geworden. Beschouwingen over het eigen karakter van het Evangelie van Johannes [The Word Became Flesh: Reflections on the Unique Character of the Gospel of John] Kampen: J. H. Kok, 1979.
 Het Evangelie naar Johannes. Proeve van een theologische exegese I – II. Kampen: J. H. Kok, 1987, 1992.
 The Gospel of John: A Theological Commentary, translated by John Vriend. Grand Rapids; Cambridge: Eerdmans, 1997. 721 pp.
 Jan Ridderbos. Mens. Kamper Miniaturen 4. Kampen: Vereniging van Oud-Studenten van de Theologische Universiteit Kampen, 1999.

References

External links 
 Herman Nicolaas Ridderbos at PhilGons.com

1909 births
2007 deaths
Dutch Calvinist and Reformed theologians
Dutch academics
People from Littenseradiel
New Testament scholars
Dutch biblical scholars
Vrije Universiteit Amsterdam alumni
Bible commentators